Paracles contraria is a moth of the subfamily Arctiinae first described by Francis Walker in 1855. It is found in the Amazon rainforest of Brazil, French Guiana and Bolivia.

References

Moths described in 1855
Paracles